Bibalucta Creek is a stream in the U.S. state of Mississippi.

Bibalucta Creek is a name derived from the Choctaw language, though sources vary as to its meaning. The GNIS translates it as "long pond in the woods", while Native American languages scholar Keith Baca believes the name is a reference to mulberries. A variant name is "Bayou Ballucta Creek".

References

Rivers of Mississippi
Rivers of Leake County, Mississippi
Rivers of Neshoba County, Mississippi
Rivers of Winston County, Mississippi
Mississippi placenames of Native American origin